Misa Hylton (previously known as Misa Hylton-Brim) is an American stylist and fashion designer. Known as a pioneer in the fashion industry, she has styled many hip-hop and R&B artists since the 1990s, most notably Lil' Kim and Mary J. Blige. Hylton's style, referred to as "hip-hop glamorous," has been credited with influencing fashion trends in popular culture. Hylton is a global creative partner for MCM and was the centerpiece of the 2019 documentary The Remix: Hip Hop x Fashion.

Early life 
Hylton was raised in Mount Vernon, New York to a mother who is of Japanese and Jamaican heritage, and a father who is African  American.  She enjoyed fashion from a young age and was also a hip-hop fan. Hylton listened to hip-hop radio stations and envisioned what the artists might be wearing. Her future boyfriend, Sean "Puffy" Combs, also grew up in Mount Vernon and lived close to one of Hylton's childhood friends.

Career beginnings 
Hylton began working in fashion when she was a 17-year-old high school student, when she assisted on a Jodeci music video. Her boyfriend and A&R intern, Sean Combs, invited her to the set, and together they convinced Uptown Records founder Andre Harrell to let the group members wear combat boots, hoodies, and backwards hats. Combs later introduced her to other artists at Uptown Records, who became some of her first clients.

Hylton most notably dressed Lil' Kim and Mary J. Blige, who she considered her muses. She began to design clothes due to the difficulty she experienced finding clothes for Lil' Kim, who was 4'11" and wore a size 4.5 shoe. Hylton was the designer and stylist for the purple jumpsuit and pasty that Lil' Kim wore to the 1999 VMAs. She stated that she focused on innovation and risk-taking with her early styles, and connected that pattern to being a member of the "hip hop generation". Hylton took inspiration from The Wiz for the fashion in Lil' Kim's "Crush on You" video. She also styled Lil' Kim for her solo debut album, Hard Core.

When she was 21, Hylton founded Chyna Doll Enterprises and provided stylists for video shoots, magazine covers, and public appearance. Chyna Doll Enterprises styled artists such as Aaliyah, Faith Evans, Jodeci, Q-Tip, Foxy Brown, and Dru Hill. By age 25 Hylton had made one million dollars as a stylist. Hylton has also styled Combs, Missy Elliott, 50 Cent, La La Anthony, Mase, Terrence Howard, and Mary J. Blige in the "Not Gon' Cry" video.

She has spoken on the barriers she faced as a young woman of the color in the fashion world. The fashion her clients wore was referred to as "ghetto fabulous," which Hylton called "hip hop glam," and was not accepted by the mainstream fashion world. She would purchase luxury fashion for her clients on her own credit card.

When Lil' Kim gained credibility after a MAC campaign, Hylton's clients began to be courted by fashion houses such as Galliano. Hylton stated in an Billboard interview that one of her favorite brands to pull for is Versace, in part because they featured Naomi Campbell as a model when dark skinned models were rarely walked by major fashion houses.

Hylton frequently collaborates with Dapper Dan. Together they created custom shorts for rapper Trina fabricated from twenty dollar bills, and styled the Fendi Zucca print suits for the "Let's Get It" music video.

Contemporary work 
In 2012 she opened Misa Hylton Fashion Academy with co-founder and stylist Jai Hudson.

Hylton starred in the documentary,The Remix: Hip Hop x Fashion, about the role of fashion in hip-hop. The film premiered at the 2019 Tribeca Film Festival.

In February 2020, Harlem's Fashion Row honored Hylton, April Walker, and Dapper Dan for their contributions to the fashion industry.

Hylton is a global creative partner for MCM. In 2018, she designed the fashion in the "Apeshit" video by Beyonce and Jay-Z. She designed custom MCM chaps and a western hat for Megan Thee Stallion's July 2019 Jimmy Kimmel Live! performance. Hylton also styled and provided fashion direction for Paper's November 2020 Flo Milli editorial shoot, which included a custom denim bustier, panty, pasties, and headwrap.

In 2021, Hylton launched her INC fashion collection for Macy’s department stores. This was part of an 'Icons of Style' campaign run by the store to promote and showcase the work of Black American style-makers and designers, including Ouigi Theodore and Zerina Akers as well as Hylton.

Impact 
Hylton frequently dressed clients in Western-inspired attire in the 90s, such as in Mary J. Blige's "All That I Can Say" music video. The trend has been traced to the "Yeehaw" style of 2019.

She is credited with shaping the way women rappers dressed in the 90s, and those styles are thought to influence women artists today. While women emcees of the 80s wore more masculine fashion, Hylton "encouraged girls in the game to celebrate their sexuality through fashion." Celebrities such as Rihanna have referenced Lil' Kim, one of Hylton's key clients, as inspirations for their fashion sense. Cardi B's gold chained headdress from the video "Money" and matching red fur and bob wig from "Backin it Up" are traced to Hylton's selections for Lil' Kim.

Hylton encouraged her first professional styling clients, Jodeci, to wear modern, casual clothing including hoodies and backwards hats instead of the de rigueur formal clothes and hard bottom shoes. The look went on to influence R&B fashion and is said to remain a point of reference for contemporary artists.

Personal life 
Hylton has three children. Rap mogul Sean Combs is the father of her first son, Justin (b.1993). She has two children with ex-husband and music executive Jojo Brim: a daughter, Madison Star Brim, who attended Howard University and is also pursuing a career in fashion; and a son, Niko, who is a rapper.

References

External links 
 
 Misa Hylton on Instagram

1978 births
Living people
African-American fashion designers
American fashion designers
20th-century American businesswomen
20th-century American businesspeople
21st-century American businesswomen
21st-century American businesspeople
American women fashion designers
African-American business executives
American people of Japanese descent
People from Mount Vernon, New York
American people of Jamaican descent
21st-century African-American women
21st-century African-American people
20th-century African-American women
20th-century African-American people
Fashion stylists